Bhakti Mein Shakti is a 1978 Bollywood film produced and directed by Dara Singh. It starred Dara Singh, Satish Kaul, Bharat Bhushan, Sunder and Yogeeta Bali in main lead.

Cast
Dara Singh as Dyanu Bhakt 
Satish Kaul as Satish 
Bharat Bhushan as Pandit 
Sunder   
Yogeeta Bali   
|Birbal as Fazlu 
Mohan Choti   
Jankidas as Pandit 
Randhir Kapoor   
Om Shivpuri as Akbar Badshah 
Komilla Wirk
Randhawa as Bandit

Soundtrack
Music - Sonik Omi

Lyrics - Inderjit Singh Tulsi

See also
 Jwala Ji Kangra

References

External links
 

1978 films
1970s Hindi-language films